Joseph Evan Tata (September 13, 1936 – August 24, 2022) was an American television actor. He was known for his regular role (1990–2000) as Nat Bussichio, the owner and operator of the Peach Pit diner, in the television series Beverly Hills, 90210 and its spin-off 90210. A prolific character actor, Tata was previously best known for his portrayal of Private Neddick on No Time for Sergeants (1964–1965), and his roles on dozens of shows including The Rockford Files and Batman.

Tata was diagnosed with Alzheimer's disease in 2018. He died in Los Angeles on August 24, 2022, at the age of 85.

Early life 
Joseph Evan Tata was born on September 13, 1936 in The Bronx borough of New York City, New York. His father was John Lucas, a vaudevillian who sometimes performed as Rosey the Singing Barber.

Career 
After being cast in his first television role in Peter Gunn in 1960, Tata went on to be a prolific character actor, appearing in dozens of shows in a variety of bit parts. Specializing in science fiction on shows like Lost in Space, Tata first became recognizable for playing henchmen on the original Batman and for his appearances on The Rockford Files.

Tata's most famous role came later in life, when he was cast as Nat Bussichio on the television series Beverly Hills, 90210. Though the show came off to a rocky start, it soon became a massive hit and cultural phenomenon, with Tata's portrayal of the kind father figure who owned the fictional Peach Pit diner earning him acclaim. Across the show's ten seasons, Tata would appear in 238 episodes. When the show was rebooted in the 2000s as 90210, Tata reprised his role on three occasions.

After appearing as Principal Frost on the ABC Family sitcom Mystery Girls in 2014, Tata retired from acting, following a more than five decade career.

Personal life 
Tata married Susan Levy on October 30, 1976, and the two subsequently divorced. They had one child, Kelly Katharine Tata. Tata described himself as a lifelong Democrat.

Death 
Tata was diagnosed with Alzheimer's disease in 2018. His daughter Kelly created a GoFundMe page to help cover the cost of his care, which continued after his death to raise money for the Alzheimer's Association. Tata died on August 24, 2022 at a care facility in the Woodland Hills neighborhood of Los Angeles at the age of eighty-five.

Tributes to Tata were paid by a large number of entertainment industry figures, including Beverly Hills, 90210 co-stars Ian Ziering, Jason Priestley, Tori Spelling, Jennie Garth, Vincent Young, and Brian Austin Green, and author Kim Gruenenfelder. A segment on Good Morning America depicting photo and video tributes from the cast and loved ones quickly went viral following Tata's death.

Filmography

References

External links
 

1936 births
2022 deaths
20th-century American male actors
21st-century American male actors
American male television actors
Entertainers from the Bronx
Male actors from New York City
People with Alzheimer's disease